St. Thomas of Villanova usually refers to Thomas of Villanova.

St. Thomas of Villanova may also refer to:
St. Thomas of Villanova College in King City, Ontario, Canada
St. Thomas of Villanova Catholic Secondary School, in LaSalle, Ontario, Canada
St. Thomas of Villanova Church on the campus of Villanova University in Villanova, Pennsylvania